The 1991 World Table Tennis Championships – Corbillon Cup (women's team) was the 34th edition of the women's team championship.

The Unified Korean team won the gold medal defeating China in the final 3–2. France won the bronze medal.

Medalists

Final stage knockout phase

Last 16

Quarter finals

Semifinals

Third-place playoff

Final

See also
List of World Table Tennis Championships medalists

References

-
1991 in women's table tennis